The Knight Errant is a 1922 British silent romance film directed by George Ridgwell and starring Madge Stuart, Rex McDougall and Olaf Hytten.

Cast
 Madge Stuart as Ernestine  
 Rex McDougall as Cecil Mordaunt Livingston  
 Olaf Hytten as Hernando Perez  
 Norma Whalley as Lady Cardwell  
 Judd Green as Mr. Perkiss  
 Eva Westlake as Mrs. Perkiss

References

Bibliography
 Goble, Alan. The Complete Index to Literary Sources in Film. Walter de Gruyter, 1999.

External links
 

1922 films
1920s romance films
British romance films
British silent feature films
1920s English-language films
Films directed by George Ridgwell
Films based on works by Ethel M. Dell
Films based on short fiction
British black-and-white films
Stoll Pictures films
1920s British films